Audvar Os (8 September 1920 – 25 June 2014) was a Norwegian barrister and civil servant.

He was born in Oslo. He served as assistant secretary in the Ministry of Justice and the Police from 1956 to 1961, and then worked as a lawyer. From 1963 he had access to Supreme Court cases. From 1967 to 1981 he worked for Oslo municipality, and from 1982 to 1990 he was the Norwegian Parliamentary Ombudsman for Public Administration.

Os was awarded the Order of St. Olav in 1986.

References

Lawyers from Oslo
Parliamentary ombudspersons in Norway
Civil servants from Oslo
1920 births
2014 deaths